The Nissan Pao is a retro-styled three-door hatchback manufactured by Nissan for model years 1989-1991, and originally marketed solely in Japan at their Nissan Cherry Stores.
 
First announced at the Tokyo Motor Show in October 1987, the Pao was available with or without a textile sun roof and was originally marketed without Nissan branding, by reservation only from January 15 through April 14, 1989.  Orders were delivered on a first come, first served basis. With 51,657 applications for the vehicle, it sold out in 3 months.  The UK’s GTR-Registry website provided updated production figures in 2022 with per-colour code quantities, and a total production quantity of 31,352. 

Because of its origins at Pike Factory, Nissan's special project group, the Pao – along with the Nissan Figaro, Be-1 and S-Cargo – are known as Nissan's "Pike cars". The promotional campaign for the car included a surreal and futuristic animated video featuring members of the Pike Factory team. 

In 2011, noted design critic Phil Patton, writing for the New York Times, called the Pike cars "the height of postmodernism" and "unabashedly retro, promiscuously combining elements of the Citroën 2CV, Renault 4, Mini [and] Fiat 500".

History

Part of Nissan's "Pike" series, it was designed as a retro fashionable city car in the mold of the Be-1. It included external door hinges like the original 1960s Austin Mini which had become fashionable in Japan, 'flap-up' windows like those of a Citroën 2CV, and a split rear tailgate of the first British hatchback car the Austin A40 Farina Countryman.  The Be-1, Pao, Figaro, and S-Cargo were attempts to create cars with designs as desirable as those of Panasonic, Sony, and other personal electronics products. The Pao's side strakes evoked the construction of earlier Woodie car body styles.

The engine was the March/Micra's 1.0 L (987 cc) MA10S, coupled with a three-speed automatic transmission or a five-speed manual transmission, the manual being the more sought after.

The chassis included rack and pinion steering, independent suspension with struts in front and 4-links and coil springs in back. Brakes were discs up front and drums in the rear. It has a clamshell hatch in back, meaning the glass section swings up and the bottom portion opens down to create a tailgate. The compact Pao requires just 4.4 m (14.4 ft) to turn and delivers up to 51 mpg (5.5 L/100 km) in the city and 79 mpg (3.4 L/100 km) at a steady 60 km/h (37 mph). The tires were of 155/SR12 format. The Pao was offered in four colors: Aqua Gray (#FJ-0), Olive Gray (#DJ-0), Ivory (#EJ-I) and Terracotta (#AJ-0).

The design of the Pao is usually credited to Naoki Sakai who also worked for Olympus, where he brought back "the brushed aluminium look". Sakai also helped design Toyota's later WiLL cars, which echo the Pike series.

Specifications

Vehicle type number: Nissan E-PK10

Models:
 Pao w/5-speed manual transmission (PK10GF) or with 3-speed automatic (PK10GA)
 Pao canvas top w/ 5-speed manual transmission (PK10GFW) or with 3-speed automatic (PK10GAW)

Dimensions and weight
 Length: 
 Width: 
 Height:  - 
 Wheelbase: 
 Front/rear tread: 
 Ground clearance: 
 Min. turning circle: 4.40 m (14.5 ft)
 Seating capacity: 5 people
 Vehicle weight:  - 
 Gross vehicle weight (kg):  - 

Fuel consumption
 City:  5-speed ; automatic 
 At steady 60 km/h (38 mph): 5-speed ; automatic 

Engine
 Type: MA10S
 Water-cooled inline-4 cylinder
 Cylinder bore and stroke: 68.0 x 68.0 mm
 Total cubic displacement: 987 cc
 Compression ratio: 9.5:1
 Output (net):  at 6000 rpm
 Largest torque (net):  at 3600 rpm
 1-bbl carburettor
 Fuel and tank capacity: unleaded regular, 

Exterior colors
 Aqua Gray (#FJ-0) (16,900 produced)
 Olive Gray (#DJ-0) (6488 produced)
 Ivory (#EJ-I) (6362 produced)
 Terracotta (#AJ-0) (1595 produced)
 Gold (#EJ-0) (1 produced)
 Blue-black (#BG-8) (1 produced)

Interior colors
 Ivory (#EJ-I)
 Black (#EJ-I)

Standard equipment
 Power steering
 Electromagnetic glass hatch release
 Height-adjustable driver's seat
 Intermittent wiper
 Tensionless ELR seat belts (front seats),
 Radio and tape deck

Optional extras
 Clock
 Tonneau cover/parcel shelf
 Drinks holder
 Dash tray 
 Under-dash tray
 Leather steering wheel grips
 Combination stereo/CD deck
 Rear speakers
 Fog lamp and front guard bar
 Lightweight aluminium wheels
 ‘Serviceable car kit’ comprising polish, brush, wash mitt, silver gloves, chamois and paperwork wallet, supplied in a courier-style bag made of Pao seat fabric

Paoside
Paoside was a range of Pao-specific products featuring the Pao logo which included accessories, clothing, toy cars and other items.

Appearances in media 
The Nissan Pao has made at least 30 appearances in films and television series, including the opening scenes of Gareth Edwards’ 2014 film adaptation of Godzilla, myriad Asian films and television and Jeremy Clarkson’s Motorworld, listed at the IMCDb database. 

A heavily modified Nissan Pao appeared in Japanese drifter and garage owner Ken Nomura’s DVD Drift Tengoku, featuring the host attempting to drift the car alongside the car’s creator, D1 Grand Prix Lights Team driver Kazayuki Akuzawa, with limited success.

References

External links 

Pao Catalog

Pao
Retro-style automobiles
Cars introduced in 1989
1990s cars
Cars discontinued in 1991